Saint Jerome the Royal (in Spanish San Jerónimo el Real) is a Roman Catholic church from the early 16th-century in central Madrid (Spain).

The church, which has undergone numerous remodelings and restorations over the centuries is the remaining structure of the Hieronymite monastery that once stood beside the royal palace of Buen Retiro, of which a portion now serves as the Prado museum. Its proximity to the royal palace also underscores a connection to royalty, serving for centuries as the church used for the investiture of the Prince of Asturias. In addition, a Mass to celebrate the investiture of King Juan Carlos I was held here. In part, this link was cemented also because Madrid only completed its Cathedral of the Almudena in 1993. For many centuries, the Church of San Isidro served as a de facto cathedral, but while this church was associated with the patron saint of Madrid, St. Isidore was also the patron of manual laborers, not royalty, thereby relegating the role of royal chapel to this church.

History

The Hieronymus monastery had been built near the river Manzanares, during the reign of Henry IV of Castile (the impotent) in the neighborhood of the El Pardo palace. But suffering due to the marshiness of the site, during the reign of  Isabella I, the Monastery of the Hieronymites was moved to a site next to an incipient royal palace. The new monastery was built in Isabelline Gothic style. The church was chosen for the investiture of the Princes of Asturias and future king Philip II on April 18, 1528.

King Philip II moved the Spanish court to Madrid in 1561, and had the retreat enlarged to become the Palacio del Buen Retiro. He established a royal bedroom against the presbytery, such that he could hear mass from his bedroom. The Palacio del Buen Retiro was largely destroyed in the Napoleonic French occupation of Madrid. In 1808 the monks were expelled from the monastery and French troops were quartered in the monastery, causing major damage to the building, and the church was almost left in ruins.

Rehabilitations 

The first major restoration was performed during the reign of Isabel II of Spain, between 1848 and 1859, by the architect Narciso Pascual Colomer, in the Isabelline Gothic style, who added some new elements such as towers. The second restoration, 1879 to 1883, by Enrique María Repullés, created the building as a parish church. Only a few external features remain of its original structure. The exterior remodeling of the nineteenth century in a neo-Gothic style by Pontian Ponzano remains controversial.

The stairway that faces the street, was constructed in 1906 on the occasion of the wedding of King Alfonso XIII to provide more impressive access to the church. For many decades, the Baroque cloister, designed by Fray Lorenzo de San Nicolás, remained in disrepair. Finally, in 2007, an agreement between the church and the government led to the appropriation of the land for the cloister by the Prado Museum. The inner courtyard facade was dismantled, and then rebuilt as a cubic room, designed by Rafael Moneo in an expansion of the museum. The wing has been derisively labeled the Cubo de Moneo, (Moneo's Cube).

Interior
The church contains sculptures by Benlliure, Juan Pascual de Mena’s 18th-century Cristo de la Buena Muerte, and paintings by Vincenzo Carducci and José Méndez, neo-Gothic lamps and stained-glass windows.

Gallery

See also
Catholic Church in Spain
Jerónimos Monastery
List of oldest church buildings

External links

WikiSource — Catholic Encyclopedia (1913)/St. Jerome
short description

Jeronimo
Monasteries in Madrid
Isabelline architecture
Gothic architecture in the Community of Madrid
Renaissance architecture in Madrid
Coronation church buildings
Roman Catholic churches completed in 1505
Roman Catholic churches completed in 1612
Buildings and structures in Jerónimos neighborhood, Madrid
17th-century Roman Catholic church buildings in Spain